Richard Lee (born 1964) is a marijuana rights activist who ran various medical marijuana programs throughout downtown Oakland, California. He is regarded as a central figure in Northern California's medical marijuana movement. He also operated a coffee shop. He has been active in working to end cannabis prohibition since 1992.

California Proposition 19
He was the chief promoter of California Proposition 19, titled the "Regulate, Control and Tax Cannabis Act of 2010", which was a measure to legalize marijuana in California. On December 14, 2009 the secretary of state confirmed receipt of enough signatures to qualify the measure for inclusion on the November 2010 ballot. The initiative failed to pass, with 54% of California voters voting "No", and 46% voting "Yes".

Oaksterdam University
In 2007, Lee founded Oaksterdam University, the United States' first cannabis-oriented "college". The unaccredited educational facility offers classes on politics and legal issues related to marijuana as well as horticulture, business management, extractions, budtending and entrepreneurship. Lee is no longer with the organization according to the website.

References

External links
Oaksterdam University Official Site

American cannabis activists
Living people
Oaksterdam University faculty
1964 births